Eleven national referendums were held in Switzerland during 2013. Voters approved six proposals related to spatial planning, executive pay, family policy, amendments to the laws on asylum and epidemics and an increase in the length of petrol station shop opening hours. The other five proposals on directly electing the Federal Council, abolishing compulsory military service, limiting salaries in a company to 12 times the lowest paid worker, tax credits for stay-at-home parents and an increase in road tax were rejected.

March referendums
The first three national referendums in 2013 were held on 3 March, with voters asked whether they supported a federal order on family policy, an amendment to the federal law on spatial planning, and a popular initiative on executive pay that would introduce binding shareholder votes on salary levels, as well as banning golden hellos for new employees and golden parachutes for departing staff. The family policy question was approved by a majority of voters, but rejected by a majority of cantons. The planning question was approved by a majority of voters and did not require a cantonal majority. The executive pay initiative was approved by around two-thirds of voters and all cantons.

Proposals

Family policy
On 15 June 2012 a federal order was passed on family planning. It would make an amendment to the Swiss Constitution requiring the federal government to work with cantonal governments to promote work–life balance and improve the provision of day care, as well as ensuring the needs of families are considered in government policies.

Planning
On 15 June 2012 an amendment to the federal law on spatial planning was passed, which limited the amount of land available to communities for development purposes to that equivalent needed for the next fifteen years. It also introduced a 20% tax rate on land transactions for owners of land for development.

Executive pay

The proposals were conceived by Thomas Minder, who launched a campaign in 2008 following significant losses at UBS, which were blamed on a bonus culture leading to excessive risk-taking by managers. They would amend legislation to:
require an annual vote by shareholders for the president and other members of the management board of directors, members of the remuneration committee, and any advisory board and executive officers of the organisation.
require the articles of association to include bonus schemes and pay plans for directors and executive officers, any loans granted to such employees, the number of mandates outside the organisation, and the duration of employment contracts of executive officers.
ban advance and severance packages.
ban corporate proxy and the representation of shareholders by depository banks.
require pension funds to disclose the way it votes, and to vote in the interests of pension policyholders.

Polls in January 2013 suggested that a majority was in favour of the proposals, although they were opposed by the Economiesuisse business lobby and the Swiss government. Supporters of the initiative spent 200,000 Swiss Francs, while opponents spent 8 million Swiss Francs in their campaign to block reform.

Electoral system
Eleven cantons allowed overseas voters to vote online after the Federal Council approved the method in December 2012.

Results

June referendums
Two referendums were held on 9 June on a popular initiative on introducing direct elections to the Federal Council, and on amendments to the Asylum Act.

Proposals

Asylum law amendments
The changes to the Asylum Law would give the Federal government increased powers to speed up the process. It would also abolish the right to apply for asylum at Swiss embassies overseas, as well as excluding conscientious objectors and deserters from applying.

The proposals were opposed by left-wing parties, trade unions, human rights groups and church groups. Prior to the referendum, opinion polls showed support for the proposals at 57%. The changes to the law were ultimately approved by almost 80% of voters.

Direct election of the Federal Council
The proposal for direct election of the Federal Council, which would involve amending the Swiss Federal Constitution, was put forward by the Swiss People's Party. Opinion polls in late May showed 66% of voters opposed. The proposal was ultimately rejected by 76% of voters.

Results

September referendums
Three federal referendums were held on 22 September 2013. The abolition of compulsory military service was rejected, whilst an amendment to epidemia law and an increase in the opening hours of petrol station shops were both approved.

Results

November referendums
Three referendums were held on 24 November on a proposed increase in road tax, limiting the highest salary in a company to twelve times the lowest salary, and tax credits for stay-at-home parents. All three were rejected by voters.

Results

References

2013 referendums
2013 elections in Switzerland
Referendums in Switzerland
Conscription referendums